Ng Uk Tsuen is the name of three villages in Hong Kong:

 Ng Uk Tsuen, North District, in North District
 Ng Uk Tsuen, Tai Po District, in Tai Po District
 Ng Uk Tsuen, Yuen Long District, in Yuen Long  District